The Height (Russian: Высота, Translit.: Vysota) is a 1957 Soviet drama film produced at Mosfilm and directed by Aleksander Zarkhi after the novel of the same name written by Evgeny Vorobyov.
It stars Nikolai Rybnikov and Inna Makarova.

Plot
A team of steel erectors has been redeployed to a steel mill construction site in a small town. The head of the squad, Nikolay Pasechnik, is a shockworker of Socialist Labour and reputed to be a darling of the women and a quick wit. Welder Katerina Petrashen', working on the construction site as well, is to be considered a pretty girl of easy virtue: she smokes (considered as an immoral act), is not a member of the Komsomol, likes party-coloured dresses and behaves provocatively.

After Nikolay and Katerina got to know each other, they develop a mutual interest. Intrigues of the building site manager, who goes on a business trip at the most crucial moment of blast-furnace tube rising and who shifted then the responsibility for the failure on to the engineer, cost Nikolay his health.

When the young ironworker is hospitalized after falling from a great height, Katya gives word to stop smoking and to start a new life.

Cast
Nikolai Rybnikov as Nikolay Pasechnik, foreman of fitters
Inna Makarova as Katya Petrashen, welder
Gennady Karnovich-Valois as Konstantin Maximovich Tokmakov, foreman from Zaporozhye
Vasily Makarov as Igor Rodionovich Deryabin, Candidate of Science, Head of the Installation Department
Marina Strizhenova as Masha, the wife of Deryabin
Boris Sitko as Innokenty Panteleimonovich Dymov, Head of Construction
Sergei Romodanov as father of Masha and Boris Berestov
Yelena Maksimova as mother of Masha and Boris Berestovs
Lev Borisov as Boris Berestov
 as Vasya Khayenko, fitter

External links 

1957 films
Russian drama films
Films directed by Aleksandr Zarkhi
Soviet drama films
Mosfilm films
1957 drama films
1950s Russian-language films